The Michigan State Fairgrounds Speedway was a dirt oval racing track located in Detroit, Michigan. The track was built in 1899 for horse racing, and it was part of the ground purchased to provide a permanent venue for the Michigan State Fair. Joseph Lowthian Hudson donated the land, at Woodward Avenue and what is now 8 Mile Road, to the Michigan State Agricultural Society. 

By 1908, the racetrack, at the east end of the fairground, had a 5,000-seat capacity grandstand. The track originally hosted Thoroughbred flat racing as well as Standardbred harness racing. Later, it was used for auto racing, after the growth of that industry. In 1971 the grandstand was declared unsafe; it was demolished in 2001.

Race winners

AAA/USAC Champ Car race winners

NASCAR Grand National race winners

See also

References

Defunct motorsport venues in the United States
Dirt oval race tracks in the United States
Motorsport venues in Michigan